Tramp Attack are an English rock band from Liverpool.

History
Tramp Attack formed in Liverpool in 2001 by Dave McCabe, Hollyoaks and Brookside actor Kristian Ealey, Matt Barton, drummer Ian Lane, bassist Scott Dulson and guitar player Tony Dunne who left early on to form The Bandits.

Dulson was replaced by James Redmond and Dunne was replaced by Dave McCabe. After quickly gaining an enthusiastic and loyal fanbase, the band secured residencies in the pubs and clubs of Liverpool and went on to win a Battle Of The Bands at The Royal Court.

The band released their debut single 'Rocky Hangover' in 2001 on Honey Records. The single was produced by Rob Ferrier at Great Northern Studios with B sides 'Broken Man'(written by McCabe) and 'Ladybird' (written by Redmond). Soon after the release of the single, the band split with Dave McCabe going on to form The Zutons and Kristian Ealey working with Edgar Jones in an early lineup of his 'Edgar Jones & the Joneses' band with Candie Payne.

Matt Barton and Ian Lane continued working together as The Mother Lovers, and released 'Rex' under that name on 'The Great Liverpool Acoustic Experiment' compilation album in 2002. Gaining little attention with their new band, the duo renamed themselves Tramp Attack and gigged regularly across Liverpool, including several shows at The Bandwagon night held at The Zanzibar. Liverpool at the time was attracting much interest from record labels large and small, and Tramp Attack proceeded to release records through the London-based Must Destroy record label, such as the band's first album 'Attack, Attack, Attack...'

In the summer of 2006 the band's second album 'Call In Sick' was released on The Viper Label. Following a brief break-up at the start of 2007 the band returned to record a new set of songs adding Tony Dunne back into the line up on keyboards. Tramp Attack continue to perform throughout the city of Liverpool and further afield, such as at the Coniston Festival.

In May 2016, former vocalist Kristian Ealey died aged 38 in Italy.

Band members

Current members
 Matt Barton ( Jack Russel) – vocals, guitar (2000–present)
 Ian Lane (a.k.a. Son of John) – drums (2000–present)
 Chris Marshall (a.k.a. Mr. Bravestar)  – bass (2002–present)
 Barry Southern (a.k.a. The Ship's Cat) – guitar (2002–present)
 Tony Dunne (a.k.a. Antoine Deschamps) - guitar (2000–2001) Keyboards (2007–present)

Former members
 Kristian Ealey – vocals (2000–2001)
 Scott Dulson – bass (2000)
 James Redmond – bass (2001)
 Dave McCabe – guitar, vocals (2000–2001)

Discography

Albums
 Attack! Attack!! Attack!!! (2004)
 Call in Sick (2006)

Singles

Compilation appearances
 The Great Liverpool Acoustic Experiment (2002) "Rex" as The Mother Lovers
 21st Century Liverpool Underground (2005) "Double Decker Bus", "Swine", "Ladybird", "Broken Man", and "Barrel of Fun".
 The Engine Room presents...vol. III (2006) "Two Feet".

References

External links
Tramp Attack on Myspace
The Viper Label
Honey Records

Musical groups from Liverpool
English indie rock groups
The Viper Label artists